Yevgeni Nikolaevich Groshev (April 3, 1937 – January 1, 2013) was an ice hockey player who played in the Soviet Hockey League.  He was born in Moscow, Soviet Union.  He played for Krylya Sovetov Moscow.  He was inducted into the Russian and Soviet Hockey Hall of Fame in 1991.

References

External links
Russian and Soviet Hockey Hall of Fame bio

1937 births
2013 deaths
Ice hockey players at the 1960 Winter Olympics
Ice hockey people from Moscow
Krylya Sovetov Moscow players
Medalists at the 1960 Winter Olympics
Olympic bronze medalists for the Soviet Union
Olympic ice hockey players of the Soviet Union
Olympic medalists in ice hockey